Pearse Park may refer to:
Pearse Park (Arklow), a GAA stadium in Arklow, County Wicklow, Ireland, also called Pearse's Park
Pearse Park (Ballybay), a GAA stadium in Ballybay, County Monaghan, Ireland
Pearse Park (Longford), a GAA stadium in Longford, Ireland
Pearse Park, a disused GAA ground in Eastfield, South Lanarkshire, Scotland

See also
Pearse Stadium, Galway